Atorrante is a 1939 Argentine film directed and written by Enrique de Rosas with Vicente Martínez Cuitiño.The film starred Enrique DeRosas and Irma Córdoba.

Cast
Enrique DeRosas
Irma Córdoba
Aída Alberti
Héctor Coire
Cirilo Etulain
Carlos Fioriti
José Herrero
Ana May
Mecha Midón
Pascual Pelliciota
Domingo Sapelli
Alberto Terrones
Oscar Valicelli

External links
 

1939 films
1930s Spanish-language films
Argentine black-and-white films
1930s Argentine films